The Southwest Nova Biosphere Reserve was designated in 2001 under the UNESCO Man and the Biosphere Programme. The Southwest Nova Biosphere Reserve spans over 1.54 million hectares  consisting of five counties in Nova Scotia, Canada: Annapolis, Digby, Queens, Shelburne and Yarmouth. The core protected areas of the biosphere reserve are Kejimkujik National Park and the Tobeatic Wilderness Area.

See also 
 Biosphere Reserves of Canada

References 

Biosphere reserves of Canada
Geography of Nova Scotia